Marian Opania (born 1 February 1943) is a Polish film actor and singer. He has appeared in more than 50 films since 1965.

Biography 
He was born on 1 February 1943 in Puławy as the second son of Julian and Jadwiga. His father was a forester and an infantry officer in the Polish Army, he died in the Warsaw Uprising.

In the years 1964–1971 he performed at the Classic Theater in Warsaw, then at the Studio Theater (1971–1977), the Kwadrat Theater (1978) and the Komedia Theater (1979–1981). Since 1981, he has been an actor at the Ateneum Theatre in Warsaw.

In 2015, he recorded an album with songs by Leonard Cohen and Jaromir Nohavica — Opania Cohen Nohavica.

Married to Anna, with whom they met in 1960.

Awards 

 Zbigniew Cybulski Award (1970)
 Meritorious Activist of Culture (1988)
 Order of Polonia Restituta (2003)
 Medal for Merit to Culture – Gloria Artis (2009).

Selected discography
 Fascynacje (2013)

Selected filmography
 Pearl in the Crown (1972)
 Man of Iron (1981)
 Dreszcze (1981)
 Hero of the Year (1987)
 Chopin: Desire for Love (2002)

References

External links

1943 births
Living people
Polish male film actors
Polish male stage actors
People from Puławy
20th-century Polish male actors
21st-century Polish male actors
Polish cabaret performers
Polish male singers
Aleksander Zelwerowicz National Academy of Dramatic Art in Warsaw alumni
Recipients of the Gold Medal for Merit to Culture – Gloria Artis
Recipient of the Meritorious Activist of Culture badge